In biochemistry, phosphorylases are enzymes that catalyze the addition of a phosphate group from an inorganic phosphate (phosphate+hydrogen) to an acceptor.

A-B + P  A + P-B

They include allosteric enzymes that catalyze the production of glucose-1-phosphate from a glucan such as glycogen, starch or maltodextrin. 

Phosphorylase is also a common name used for glycogen phosphorylase in honor of Earl W. Sutherland Jr., who in the late 1930s discovered it as the first phosphorylase.

Function 
Phosphorylases should not be confused with phosphatases, which remove phosphate groups.
In more general terms, phosphorylases are enzymes that catalyze the addition of a phosphate group from an inorganic phosphate (phosphate + hydrogen) to an acceptor, not to be confused with a phosphatase (a hydrolase) or a kinase (a phosphotransferase). A phosphatase removes a phosphate group from a donor using water, whereas a kinase transfers a phosphate group from a donor (usually ATP) to an acceptor.

Types 
The phosphorylases fall into the following categories:
Glycosyltransferases (EC 2.4)
Enzymes that break down glucans by removing a glucose residue (break O-glycosidic bond)
glycogen phosphorylase
starch phosphorylase
maltodextrin phosphorylase
Enzymes that break down nucleosides into their constituent bases and sugars (break N-glycosidic bond)
Purine nucleoside phosphorylase (PNPase)
Nucleotidyltransferases (EC 2.7.7)
Enzymes that have phosphorolytic 3' to 5' exoribonuclease activity (break phosphodiester bond)
RNase PH
Polynucleotide Phosphorylase (PNPase)

All known phosphorylases share catalytic and structural properties.

Activation 
Phosphorylase a is the more active R form of glycogen phosphorylase that is derived from the phosphorylation of the less active R form,  phosphorylase b with associated AMP. The inactive T form is either phosphorylated by phosphoylase kinase and inhibited by glucose, or dephosphorylated by phosphoprotein phosphatase with inhibition by ATP and/or glucose 6-phosphate. Phosphorylation requires ATP but dephosphorylation releases free inorganic phosphate ions.

Pathology 
Some disorders are related to phosphorylases:

 Glycogen storage disease type V - muscle glycogen
 Glycogen storage disease type VI - liver glycogen

See also
Hydrolase

References

External links 
Muscle phosphorylase deficiency - McArdle's Disease Website
 

Transferases
EC 2.4.1